, which means "The Knights", are a Japanese rock band. They have a retro image, wearing Japanese school uniforms in the style of bōsōzoku. The lead singer, Sho Ayanokoji (often styled as "Show Ayanocozey"), was DJ Ozma, until he retired in December 2008. Kishidan announced a "comeback", after a three-year break, on January 27, 2009. The band had never officially split up, but had been taking a break while Show and Hikaru were working on the DJ Ozma side project. Their song, Omae Dattanda released on November 10, 2009, was used for the 11th ending theme song for Naruto Shippuden. They are signed to Avex Trax and are managed by Sony Music Artists. Their song, Warera Omou, Yue ni Warera Ari, is used for the opening theme song for Kamen Rider Ghost, released on December 9, 2015

Members

  — Vocals, Dragon Voice, Emcee and Guitar; born June 24, 1979
  — Dance and Scream; born January 24
  — Guitar; born October 23
  — Guitar; born March 1. Joined the group in late 1998.
  — Bass guitar; born March 17. Joined the group January 1999.

Currently Suspended

  — Drums; born May 24. On February 9, 2013 it was announced via Twitter that Yukki was taking time off to be treated for dystonia. In March 2014 the band's management stated that he would continue to be on an indefinite leave of absence.

Stage personas

Their various uniforms, modeled after the short and long-coat bōsōzoku-preferred versions of old Japanese gakuran (boys' school uniforms), their matching bōsōzoku uniforms (the kind modeled on those worn by kamikaze pilots)—everything is done with a touch of humor and a nostalgic fondness for the gangs and values of days not-long gone by. Since the band started touring again in 2009, they have started wearing different styles of gakuran, as well as outfits from Tokyo-based fashion group, Saturday Nite.

The group's lyrics are  predominantly about motorcycles, being with your gang, conflicts with school, and adolescent love.  Though Kishidan has something of a comic approach to their presentation and performances, their songs are often sincere and about issues that are generally important to young people.

Kishidan's hit songs "One Night Carnival" and "Zoku" were featured in Nintendo's Osu! Tatakae! Ouendan, and Moero! Nekketsu Rhythm Damashii Osu! Tatakae! Ouendan 2, respectively, which are games about ouendan (cheer squads). The song "One Night Carnival" (a cover version) is even used for a level that was inspired by one of Kishidan's live performances. Coincidentally, the characters wear long gakuran coats and dance like Kishidan. The dancing style is based on actual ouendan cheering routines, and long gakuran coats are often worn by ouendan cheer teams. It is possible that Kishidan's lively and powerful dance routines were inspired by the tradition of ouendan cheering, a subject that is unique to Japanese culture.

Controversies

A February 2011 appearance on MTV Japan's Mega Vector program was heavily criticized by the Simon Wiesenthal Center after the band appeared in costumes resembling Nazi SS uniforms. The band's agency, Sony Music Artists, issued a statement of apology, noting that the band members "deeply regretted" their attire and that the clothing "was not meant to carry any ideological meaning whatsoever." Avex Group, the band's current record label, also sent an apology through its homepage.

Live show

Kishidan embraces the theatrics of rock music in their live performance, and make extensive use of pop dancing and theatrics. Members of the band will sometimes pretend to perish mid-concert in battle with rival school gangs. Kishidan is also known to parody current popular Japanese songs, such as Matsudaira Ken's "Matsuken Samba II", and Nakashima Mika's "Glamorous Sky" from the film adaptation of Nana.

Use of ateji

Since transferring to Avex, the band started to use ateji to promote their singles. In every promotional video, the band uses the ateji character for the Avex Trax label, .

Discography

Albums
 房総与太郎路薫狼琉 (Bousou Yotarou Rock'n'Roll) (2000-10-06)
 One Night Carnival (2001-06-22)
 1/6 Lonely Night (2002-04-11)
 Boys' Color (2003-03-26)
 Too Fast to Live Too Young to Die (2004-03-17)
 死無愚流　呼麗苦衝音+3 (Singles Collection +3) (2004-11-25)
 愛 羅 武 勇 (Ai Ra Bu Yuu / "I Love You")(2005-10-26)
 Six Senses (2007-03-28)
 Kishidan Grateful EMI Years 2001-2008 房総魂: Song for Route 127 (2008-6-11)
 木更津グラフィティ (Kisarazu Graffiti) (2010-09-15)
 日本人 (Nipponjin) (2012-04-25)
 氣志團入門 (Kishidan Nyuumon) (2013-09-11)
 不良品 (Furyohin) (2016-01-27)
 万謡集 (Manyoshu) (2017-08-09)
 ONE WAY GENERATION (2021-04-08) 
  YANK ROCK HEREØS (2023-01-01)

Singles
 "One Night Carnival" (2002-05-29)
 "恋人／Love Balladは歌えない" ("Koibito/Love Ballad wa Utaenai") (2002-09-04)
 "スウィンギン・ニッポン" ("Swingin' Nippon") (2003-06-11)
 "Secret Love Story" (2003-10-29)
 "キラ キラ！" ("Kira Kira!") (2004-02-18)
 "結婚闘魂行進曲「マブダチ」" ("Kekkon Toukon Koushinkyoku "Mabudachi"") (2004-06-16)
 "族" ("Zoku") (2004-09-01)
 "夢見る頃を過ぎても" ("Yumemiru koro o Sugitemo") (2005-03-02)
 "俺達には土曜日しかない" ("Oretachi ni wa Doyoubi Shikanai") (2005-06-15)
 "You & Me Song" (2005-09-07)
 "The アイシテル" ("The Aishiteru") (2006-08-09)
 "さよなら世界/おまえだったんだ" ("Sayonara Sekai/Omae Dattan da") (2009-11-11)
 "愛してナイト!" ("Aishite Night!") (2010-09-01)
 "Super Boy Friend" (2012-09-05)
 "我ら思う、故に我ら在り" ("Warera Omou, Yue Ni Warera Ari") (2015-12-09)
 "No rain, No rainbow" (2020-09-23)

DVD
 氣志團現象－外伝－DVD「恋人」 (2002-09-26)
(Kishidan Genshou ~ Gaiden ~ DVD "Koibito")
 氣志團現象完全版－2000－2002－ (2003-03-05)
(Kishidan Genshou Kanzenban - 2000-2002 -)
 氣志團万博2003木更津グローバル・コミュニケーション！！～Born in the toki no K-city～ (2003-11-27)
(Kishidan Banpaku 2003 Kisarazu Global Communication!! ~Born in the toki no K-city~)
 氣志團現象大全: Samurai Spirit Suicide (2004-07-26)
(Kishidan Genshou Daizen -Samurai Spirit Suicide-)
 氣志團現象最終章"The Last Song"in 東京ドーム (2005-02-23)
(Kishidan Genshou Saishuushou "The Last Song" in Tokyo Dome)
 氣志團現象番外編 Never Ending Summer (2005-12-07)
(Kishidan Genshou Bangaihen Never Ending Summer)
 氣志團万博2006 極東 Never Land (2006-12-20)
(Kishidan Banpaku 2006 Kyokutou Never Land)
 氣志團列島-Japanolomania- NHKスーパーライブRe-edit (2008-6-11)
 氣志團現象2009 Again and Again (2009-7-4)
(Kishidan Genshou 2009 Again and Again)

Other
 氣志團現象（１）～さよならの果実たち～ (VHS 2001-12-06)
(Kishidan Genshou (1) ~Sayonara no Kajitsutachi~)
 氣志團現象（２）～肌色だけのエンジェル～ (VHS 2002-01-23)
(Kishidan Genshou (2) ~Hadairo Dake no Angel~)
 氣志團現象（３）～朝日の中のレクイエム～ (VHS 2002-02-27)
(Kishidan Genshou (3) ~Asahi no Naka no Requiem~)
 族 (Zoku) (2004-09-01)
 夢見る頃を過ぎても (Yumemiru koro wo Sugitemo) (2005-03-02)
 俺達には土曜日しかない (Oretachi ni wa Doyoubi Shikanai) (2005-06-15)
 You & Me Song (2005-09-07)
 The アイシテル (The AISHITERU) (2006-08-09)

References

External links
  
Kishidan Official Homepage at Toshiba-emi 
Current official Kishidan Member Blog 
Kishidan-chan blog archives (to July 2006) 

Japanese rock music groups
Avex Group artists
Musical groups from Chiba Prefecture
Japanese comedy musical groups
Comedy rock musical groups
Bands with fictional stage personas